Electra Lake is a privately owned reservoir in La Plata County Colorado. Owned by Xcel Energy, Electra Lake provides water storage for the Tacoma Hydro Generating Station.

History

The lake was named after Electra, a character in mythology.

No hydroelectric energy is produced at the dam; water is channeled  offsite to the Tacoma Hydro Generating Station via a  open wooden flume, "one of only two wooden flumes still operating on hydro projects in the United States."  The Tacoma powerhouse stands in the Animas River Canyon and is accessible only by the Durango and Silverton Narrow Gauge Railroad.

Owned and operated by Xcel Energy, the dam was rebuilt in 1980.

Recreation and marinas
The lake is open to the public for fee use during the summer months.

References

Buildings and structures in La Plata County, Colorado
Reservoirs in Colorado
Dams in Colorado
Xcel Energy dams
Bodies of water of La Plata County, Colorado
1902 establishments in Colorado